Rodica Bretin (born 6 November 1958) is a Romanian writer specialized in history and fantastic literature.

Rodica Bretin was born in Brasov and since 1982 is living in Bucharest. A renowned writer in Romania and Eastern Europe, Rodica Bretin has been a member of the Romanian Writers Union (USR) since 1991 and Fantasia Art Association (Cornwall, England) since 1996. She is also a scientific researcher, specialised in history, having participated at historical and archaeological campaigns in: Transylvania, Romania (1996), Languedoc, France (1998) and Milano, Italy (2002).

Works

Fiction books
Holographic Effect (Effect Holografic) (Albatros Publishing House, 1985)
The White Hawk (Şoimul Alb) (Facla Publishing House, 1987)
The Giant (Uriaşul cel Bun) (Ion Creanga Publishing House, 1989)
Neverending Road (Drumul fără Sfârşit) (Baricada Publishing House, 1991)
The One who Comes from the Shadow (Cel care vine din Urmă) (Baricada Publishing House, 1993)
World of Hind (Lumea lui Hind) (Coresi Publishing House, 1998)
The Sandman (Omul de Nisip) (Image Publishing House, 2000)
Iron Maiden (Fecioara de Fier) (Coresi Publishing House, 2002; second edition, Pocket Book Publishing House, 2006; third edition Eagle Publishing House, 2015; fourth edition Tritonic Publishing House, 2017)
The City Without Past (Cetatea fără trecut) (Nemira Publishing House, 2015)
The Fortress (Fortăreaţa) (Tritonic Publishing House, 2016)
Men and Gods, volume 1 of The Protectors trilogy (Oameni şi Zei, volumul 1 din trilogia Protectorii) (Tritonic Publishing House, 2017)
The Stargate, volume 2 of The Protectors trilogy (Poarta Stelară, volumul 2 din trilogia Protectorii) (Tritonic Publishing House, 2018)
Elysium, volume 3 of The Protectors trilogy (Elysium, volumul 3 din trilogia Protectorii) (Tritonic Publishing House, 2019)
The House Without Books (Casa fără cărţi) (Pavcon Publishing House, 2020)
The Twilight of the Chosen People (Amurgul elkilor) (Creator Publishing House, 2021)

History books
Files of the Impossible (Dosarele Imposibilului) (Pocket Book, 2003)
The Time Tunnel (Tunelul Timpului) (Pocket Book, 2003)
The Witches' Gate (Poarta Vrăjitoarelor) (Pocket Book, 2004, Nemira Publishing House 2015)
Poltergeist: The Invisible Foes (Poltergeist: atacatori invizibili) (Pocket Book, 2005)
The Mystery of Parallel Worlds (Misterul Lumilor Paralele) (Pocket Book, 2006)
Lost in Time (Naufragiaţi în Timp) (Pocket Book, 2006)
Voyages in Time and Parallel Worlds (Călătorii în timp şi Lumi paralele) (Nemira Publishing House, 2015)
Chronicles of the Impossible (Cronicile Imposibilului) (ePublishers, 2015)
The Vikings - Warrior of the Nord (Războinicii Nordului) (ePublishers, 2015)  
Echoes from Beyond (Ecouri din tenebre) (Crux Publishing House, 2016; Creator Publishing House, 2022)
The Last Frontier (Ultima Frontieră) (Pavcon Publishing House, 2021)

Anthologist
Anthologist and translator of the mainstream/fantastic literature anthologies:
Chronicles from the Forbidden Worlds (2003)
Hunters of the Other World (2006)
Co-anthologist at the Antares anthologies with Dan Apostol, 4 volumes (1991–1995), about ancient civilisations, unexplained phenomena and fantastic literature.

Translation works
Dale Cooper, by S. Frost, 1993
Lady Chatterley's Lover, by D. H. Lawrence, 1993
La Feline Geante, by J.-H. Rosny aîné, 1993
Dans le Ombre de la Guillotine, by O .LeBaron, 1994

Literary awards
 Award for the Best Foreign Story for the story The Darkness, at the International Festival of Fantastic Art (Annecy, France, 1996)
 Volaverunt Award for the story The Conquistador, at the Festival of Valencia  (Spain, 2001)
 The Best Foreign Novel awarded by Fantasia Art Association (Cornwall, Great Britain, 2005) for the historical novel The Iron Maiden
 The COLIN Award, at the 7th edition, 2017, for The City Without Past, a short story book.
 The OPERA OMNIA Award, at the 40th edition of the National Science Fiction and Fantasy Convention, Romania, 2019.
 The Novelette Award, at the 43rd National Science-fiction and Fantasy Convention, 2022, for the story Twilight of the Chosen Ones from the volume with the same title. 
 The Prose Prize, awarded in 2022 by the Association Buna Vestire and the Brasov branch of the writers' union for the volume Twilight of the Chosen Ones, Creator Publishing House, Brasov, 2021.

See also
 List of Romanian writers

References

Sources
 John Clute, Peter Nicholls:The Encyclopedia of Science Fiction, Orbit, London, 1993
 Nemira's Dictionary of Fantasy&Science-Fiction Romanian Writers, Nemira, Bucharest, 1999
 CDB's Catalogue of Authors, Pocket Book Publishing House, Bucharest, 2006
 Jean-Pierre Moumon: Antares Anthologies, La Valette, France, 1987 and 2008
 The Historian, Truro, Cornwall, Great Britain, 2006
 Romanian Writers Union site scriitorilor.ro/Bucharest/main-stream 
 Today's Romanian Writers, Gates of the Orient Publishing House, Iasi, 2011
 Contemporary Romanian Writers , Arial Publishing House, Ploiești, Romania, 2013
 Personalities from contemporary Romanian Women, Meronia Publishing House, Bucharest, 2013
 Encyclopedia of Contemporary Romanian Writers from all over the World, Phoenix Publishing House, Chişinău, Moldova, 2020

1958 births
Living people
Writers from Bucharest
20th-century Romanian historians
Romanian novelists
Romanian women novelists
Women anthologists
Women historians
People from Brașov
21st-century Romanian historians